Martins Martey Morgan (born 28 May 1986), better known by his stage name Lord Morgan, is a Ghanaian dancehall and afrobeats artiste, songwriter, and composer.  He is best known for the song Ayalolo, a slogan which was adopted for a Transport System by ex-Ghanaian President, John Mahama. He was awarded the overall Artist of the Year at the Ghana Music and Film awards in GA Damage and Ewe in 2018.

Early life and education 
Morgan was born in Afienya. He attended the Leadership Training Institute at Afienya in the Greater Accra Region.

Awards & Recognition 
Gadangme and Ewe Music and Film awards(winner)

Albums & Ep 
Vibration is Prayer(2017)

Journey from Afienya(2019)

Gold EP(2020)

References 

Living people
1986 births